Mjøndalen is a built up area in Drammen municipality in Viken county (formerly Buskerud county), Norway. It is situated south of the Drammenselva River opposite of Krokstadelva.

History
Mjøndalen has traditionally been a railway site most known as an industrial sawmill location. Historically Mjøndalen was known for its industry; including paper & pulp production and a substantial cellulose industry. The production of wood products and furniture are also traditional commercial activities. All the paper mills closed in the late 1960s and early 1970s.

Sports and media
Mjøndalen has a friendly sports rivalry with the neighbouring communities of Solbergelva and Krokstadelva. The rivalry is mostly in sports such as football and bandy  and cross-country skiing. In football, Mjøndalen IF Fotball plays in Eliteserien, the top tier in the Norwegian league system. In bandy, Mjøndalen IF have become Norwegian champions several times. The newspaper Eikerbladet is published in Mjøndalen.

Mjøndalen Church
Mjøndalen Church (Mjøndalen Kirke) was opened in 1983.  It was built after drawings by architect Elisabeth Breen Fidjestøl. The building was constructed of brick and wood and has 380 seats.  The building consists of the church sanctuary and adjacent church hall, offices,  chapel and youth department and group rooms. It is part of the Church of Norway and belongs to Eiker Prosti in the Diocese of Tunsberg.

Portåsen

Portåsen is a museum honouring the life and writing of Herman Wildenvey, a prominent Norwegian poet. Herman Wildenvey lived the first three years of his life in Mjøndalen. At three years of age, he was moved to the Portåsen farm on the edge of the forest above the village.

Today Portåsen, Wildenveys rike is a cultural centre, meeting place and venue for local, regional and national artists. The site includes a newly renovated farmhouse and farm buildings. Stiftelsen Portåsen is the organization which works on the development of Portåsen and which operates in affiliation with Buskerud Museum (Buskerudmuseet), a foundation for the preservation of cultural heritage within Buskerud.

Notable residents

References

External links
Picture and map of Mjøndalen
Portåsen official website

Villages in Buskerud
Nedre Eiker
Drammen